The Women's 25K race at the 2010 FINA World Open Water Swimming Championships was swum on Thursday, July 22, 2010 in Roberval, Quebec, Canada.

The race began at 9:15 a.m., and was swum in the Lac Saint-Jean in the city centre. 14 women swam the event.

The 25 kilometre distance of the race was reached by completed 10 laps of the 2.5-kilometre course set up for the championships.

Results
All times in hours:minutes:seconds

References

Fina World Open Water Swimming Championships - Women's 25k, 2010
World Open Water Swimming Championships